Martin Roman Perez (born February 28, 1946) is a former shortstop and second baseman for the California Angels (1969–70), Atlanta Braves (1971–76), San Francisco Giants (1976), New York Yankees (1977) and Oakland Athletics (1977–78).

He was born in Visalia, California, of Indigenous Mexican ancestry, to Martin and Dora (Garcia) Perez. Martin Sr. was born in Aguascaliente, Mexico. Dora's father, identified in records as Mission Indian, attended Sherman Indian School in Riverside, California. Dora's mother was a Yaqui curandera, or traditional healer, from Altar, Sonora, Mexico. The family had close ties to the family of Mike Garcia, the pitcher for the Cleveland Indians, and both referred to each other as cousins.

Minor League career
Perez played football, basketball and baseball for Redwood High School, signed with the California Angels as an amateur free agent after graduation, and served in the U.S. Marine Corps Reserve. He was an infielder in the minor leagues from 1964-69 (Idaho Falls, Quad Cities, San Jose, El Paso, Hawaii).

He led Texas League shortstops in assists with 363 and in double plays with 72 at El Paso in 1968. He led Pacific Coast League shortstops in double plays with 79 in 1969, and played on the Hawaii team that won the PCL Southern Division Championship in 1970.

Major League career
Perez was called up to the majors as relief shortstop for Jim Fregosi in September 1969, and in October 1970 was traded to Atlanta.

Perez, 5 feet 10 inches and 160 pounds, was the Braves' starting shortstop from 1971–73 and their starting second baseman the following two seasons. In 1971, he helped the club break the all-time Braves' record for double plays in a season with 180.

In 1976, he was the Giants' most-used second baseman, appearing in 89 games there after his June 13 acquisition in a trade that included future Giants' slugger Darrell Evans. He led National League second basemen in fielding percentage in 1974.

Perez was acquired in March 1977 by the defending AL champion New York Yankees to shore up their middle-infield and possibly compete for the starting shortstop position. Soon after, however, the Yankees traded for Bucky Dent to play shortstop and Perez finished his career at Oakland in 1977-78. 

In 10 seasons, he played in 931 games and had 3,131 at bats, 313 runs, 771 hits, 180 doubles, 22 triples, 22 home runs, 241 RBI, 11 stolen bases and 245 walks. His career batting average was .246. He had a .301 on-base percentage and .316 slugging percentage with 989 total bases, 56 sacrifice hits, 20 sacrifice flies and 10 intentional walks.

Post-baseball
Perez is married and has two adult daughters. He lives in the Atlanta area and owns Marty Perez Insurance in Lithonia, Georgia.

References

External links
Baseball Reference

1947 births
Living people
Atlanta Braves players
American baseball players of Mexican descent
American people of Yaqui descent
Baseball players from California
California Angels players
El Paso Sun Kings players
Hawaii Islanders players
Idaho Falls Angels players
Major League Baseball second basemen
Major League Baseball shortstops
New York Yankees players
Oakland Athletics players
Quad Cities Angels players
San Francisco Giants players
San Jose Bees players
Tidewater Tides players